The Ultimate Life is a 2013 American drama and romance film directed by Michael Landon Jr. from a screenplay written by Brian Bird and Lisa G. Shillingburg, which is in turn based on the best selling novel by Jim Stovall. It stars Logan Bartholomew, Peter Fonda, and Ali Hillis, and was released on September 6, 2013 in the United States. It is the sequel to The Ultimate Gift.

Plot 
3 years after the events of The Ultimate Gift, Jason Stevens (Logan Bartholomew) is running the Stevens Foundation after inheriting the trust of his grandfather, Red Stevens. Planning to propose to Alexia (Ali Hills), Jason is interrupted by a notice of a lawsuit by his aunts and uncles members vying for control of the foundation (and thus the inheritance left by Red). So focused on fighting the lawsuit and the continued pursuit of his wealth, Jason does not have time to listen to Alexia's announcement that she has decided to become a disaster nurse in Haiti for six months. Alexia leaves a note with Jason who reads the news of Alexia's departure with shock. Going to his grandfather's friend and lawyer, Mr. Hamilton (Bill Cobbs) for advice, Mr. Hamilton reveals that his grandfather had written a personal journal that he encourages Jason to read for advice.

The rest of the film is a frame story covering the life of Red Stevens and his pursuit of his wealth.

References

External links 
 
 
 

2013 films
2013 romantic comedy-drama films
2013 comedy films
2013 drama films